Lata Narvekar is a popular Marathi drama producer who produced popular plays like ‘Sahi Re Sahi’, ‘Amchyasarkhe Amhich’ and ‘Lochya Jhala Re’. Lata Narvekar’s Chintamani Productions is a premier Marathi theatre production house in Maharashtra.

She has also produced two Marathi films in partnership with her friend Bharati Achrekar – Sarivar Sari and Sakhi.

References

External links
 

Marathi theatre
Indian theatre managers and producers
Living people
Indian women theatre directors
Indian stage actresses
1940 births